Cosmotriche is a genus of moths in the family Lasiocampidae. The genus was erected by Jacob Hübner in 1820.

Species
The genus consists of the following species:
Cosmotriche lobulina Schiffermüller, 1775
Cosmotriche discitincta Wileman, 1914
Cosmotriche monotona Daniel, 1953

References

Lasiocampidae